Samanpur was a village development committee in Rautahat District in the Narayani Zone of south-eastern Nepal.

Just before 2017 Nepalese local elections, it was merged with other 5 Village development committees  Gamhariya, Sangrampur, Bahuwa Madanpur, Dharampur and Bariyarpur to form Gadhimai Municipality.

At the time of the 1991 Nepal census, it had a population of 5352 people living in 982 individual households.

References

Populated places in Rautahat District